Drummond is a town in eThekwini Metro in the KwaZulu-Natal province of South Africa.

Village 45 km west of Durban. It was named after F C Drummond, former director of the Natal Land and Colonisation Company.

It is famous for being the halfway mark of the Comrades Marathon.

Visit the local community website for more information on this area and the local events and entertainment available (www.seeupperhighway.com)

References

Populated places in eThekwini Metropolitan Municipality